The grammar of the Polish language is characterized by a high degree of inflection, and has relatively free word order, although the dominant arrangement is subject–verb–object (SVO). There are no articles, and there is frequent dropping of subject pronouns. Distinctive features include the different treatment of masculine personal nouns in the plural, and the complex grammar of numerals and quantifiers.

Regular morphological alternation

Certain regular or common alternations apply across the Polish inflectional system, affecting the morphology of nouns, adjectives, verbs, and other parts of speech. Some of these result from the restricted distribution of the vowels i and y, and from the voicing rules for consonants in clusters and at the end of words. Otherwise, the main changes are the following:
vowel alternations, arising from the historical development of certain vowels, which cause vowel changes in some words depending on whether the syllable is closed or open, or whether the following consonant is soft or hard;
consonant changes caused by certain endings (such as the -ie of the locative case, and the -i of the masculine personal plural), which historically entailed palatalization of the preceding consonant, and now produce a number of different changes depending on which consonant is involved.

Nouns

Polish retains the Old Slavic system of cases for nouns, pronouns, and adjectives. There are seven cases: nominative , genitive , dative , accusative , instrumental , locative , and vocative .

Number 
Polish has two number classes: singular and plural.

It used to also have the dual number, but it vanished around the 15th century. It survived only in a few relicts:

 body parts that naturally come in pairs have synchronically irregular plural and other forms
 oko ("eye") – pl. oczy, genitive plural oczu, instrumental plural regular oczami or irregular oczyma; but not in the sense of "drop of fat on a liquid", which is declined regularly
 ręka ("hand, arm") – pl. ręce, locative singular regular ręce or irregular ręku, instrumental plural regular rękami or irregular rękoma
 ucho ("ear") – pl. uszy, genitive plural uszu, instrumental plural regular uszami or irregular uszyma; but not in the sense of "a handle (of a jug or a kettle, etc.)", which is declined regularly
 certain proverbs, e.g. Mądrej głowie dość dwie słowie (lit. "two words are enough for a wise head"), with dual dwie słowie (modern dwa słowa)

Gender 

Note that for true nouns (not for adjectives), there are three cases that always have the same ending in the plural, regardless of gender or declension class: dative plural in -om, instrumental plural in -ami or -mi, and locative plural in -ach ; the only apparent exception being nouns that are in fact inflected as previously dual nouns, ex. rękoma instrumental plural of ręka "hand".

Inflection 
There are three main genders (rodzaje): masculine (męski), feminine (żeński) and neuter (nijaki). Masculine nouns are further divided into personal (męskoosobowy), animate (męskożywotny), and inanimate (męskorzeczowy) categories. Personal and animate nouns are distinguished from inanimate nouns in the accusative singular; for the latter the accusative is identical to the nominative. In the plural, the masculine personal nouns are distinguished from all others, which collapse into one non-masculine personal gender (niemęskoosobowy).

The following tables show this distinction using as examples the nouns mężczyzna 'man' (masc. personal), pies 'dog' (masc. animate), stół 'table' (masc. inanimate), kobieta 'woman' (feminine), okno 'window' (neuter). The following table presents examples of how a determiner ten/ta/to ("this") agrees with nouns of different genders in the nominative and the accusative, both singular and plural. Adjectives inflect similarly to this determiner.

For verbs, the distinction is only important for past forms in the plural, as in the table below:

The numeral dwa ("two"), on the other hand, behaves differently, merging masculine non-personal with neuter, but not with feminine:

Morphological endings 
Gender can usually be inferred from the ending of a noun.

Masculine:
 masculine nouns typically end in a consonant
 some nouns, describing people, end in -a, specifically:
 all nouns ending in -sta, equivalent to English "-ist", e.g. artysta ("artist"), kapitalista ("capitalist"), konserwatysta ("conservative"), socjalista ("socialist")
 all nouns ending in -nauta, equivalent to English "-naut", e.g.  argonauta ("argonaut"), astronauta ("astronaut"), kosmonauta ("cosmonaut")
 last names
 first names Barnaba, Bonawentura, also Kuba (diminutive of Jakub)
 emotionally charged nicknames, e.g. beksa ("crybaby"), łamaga, niezdara, oferma (all three of which mean "a clumsy person")
 some other nouns, e.g. satelita ("satellite"), wojewoda ("voivode"); hrabia ("count") and sędzia ("judge") – both partially declined like adjectives
 some personal names end in -o, e.g. Horeszko, Kościuszko; those decline in singular like feminine nouns ending in -a
 some nouns, which were originally adjectives, end in -i and -y; those decline in singular like adjectives
Feminine:
 feminine nouns typically end in -a
 some nouns end in a soft or hardened consonant:
 all abstract nouns ending in -ść, e.g. miłość ("love"), nieśmiałość ("shyness"), zawiść ("envy"), etc.
 some concrete nouns ending in -ść: kiść ("bunch"), kość ("bone"), maść ("ointment"), ość ("fishbone"), przepaść ("chasm"), wieść ("news")
-b: głąb ("depth")
-c: moc ("power"), noc ("night"), pomoc ("help"), przemoc ("violence"), równonoc ("equinox"), Wielkanoc ("Easter"), wszechmoc ("omnipotence")
-cz: Bydgoszcz, ciecz ("liquid"), dzicz ("wilderness"), klacz ("mare"), kokorycz ("corydalis"), rzecz ("thing"), smycz ("leash")
-ć: brać ("company"), chuć ("lust"), jać ("yat"), mać (archaic for "mother"), płeć ("sex, gender"), sieć ("net")
-dź: czeladź (a collective term for servants of one master during the Middle Ages(pl)"), gołoledź ("black ice"), krawędź ("edge"), łódź ("boat"), miedź ("copper"), odpowiedź ("answer"), powódź ("flood"), spowiedź ("confession"), wypowiedź ("utterance"), zapowiedź ("announcement")
-j: kolej ("railway")
-l: kąpiel ("bath"), myśl ("thought"), sól ("salt")
-ń: baśń ("fable"), czerń ("the colour black, blackness"), czerwień ("the colour red, redness"), dłoń ("palm"), goleń ("shin"), jaźń ("self, ego"), jesień ("autumn"), kieszeń ("pocket"), krtań ("larynx"), otchłań ("abyss"), pieczeń ("roasted meat"), pieśń ("song"), pleśń ("mould"), przestrzeń ("space"), przyjaźń ("friendship"), przystań ("haven"), skroń ("temple"), waśń ("feud"), woń ("odour"), zieleń ("the colour green, greenness")
-p: Gołdap
-rz: macierz ("matrix"), twarz ("face")
-sz: mysz ("mouse"), wesz ("louse")
-ś: Białoruś ("Belarus"), gęś ("goose"), oś ("axis"), pierś ("breast"), Ruś ("Ruthenia"), wieś ("village")
-ź: gałąź ("branch"), rzeź ("slaughter")
-ż: grabież ("pillage"), młodzież ("youth"), odzież ("clothing"), podaż ("supply"), sprzedaż ("sale"), straż ("guard"), uprząż ("harness")
-w: brew ("eyebrow"), brukiew ("rutabaga"), marchew ("carrot"), konew ("jug"), krew ("blood"), rukiew ("watercress"), rzodkiew ("radish"), żagiew ("torch")
words ending in -ini are feminine, e.g. bogini ("goddess"); also pani ("Mrs")
feminine last names ending in a consonant are invariable
Neuter:
neuter nouns typically end in -o
verbal nouns, which are always neuter, end in -e, e.g. jedzenie, śpiewanie, etc.
diminutives ending in -ę are always neuter, e.g. źrebię ("foal"), dziecię ("child")
Latin loanwords ending in -um : invariable in the singular, declinable in the plural by removing the -um ending and replacing it by neuter plural endings ; the genitive plural is in -ów contrary to other neuters that have no ending → muzeum, muzea (N. pl.), muzeów (G. pl.)
loanwords ending in -i are neuter and invariable, e.g. kiwi, Brunei, Burundi
acronyms ending in a vowel (in pronunciation), e.g. BMW ; if an acronym is native, its gender may also be equal to the gender of the noun in the full version of the acronym

Semantic membership 
The distinction between personal, animate and inanimate nouns within masculine nouns is largely semantic, although not always.

Personal nouns are comprised by human nouns such as mężczyzna 'man' or sędzia 'male judge', personal names of men, as well as the noun bóg 'male god' and proper names of male gods (e.g. Rod "Rod", Jowisz "Jupiter").

Animate nouns are largely comprised by animals such as pies ("dog") or pawian ("baboon"), many members from other life domains, as well as a number of objects associated with human activity. On the morphological level however, such nouns are only partially similar to animate nouns, having their accusative identical to their genitive only in the singular. 
Some examples : 

names of fruit, e.g. ananas ("pineapple"), banan ("banana")
names of fungi, bacteria, viruses, e.g. borowik ("cep"), grzyb ("mushroom"), wirus ("virus"), gronkowiec ("staphylococcus")
names of consumer goods and brands, e.g. mercedes ("Mercedes car"), Nikon (as in Mam Nikona – "I have a Nikon"), papieros ("cigarette")
names of currency, e.g. dolar ("dollar"), funt ("pound")
names of dances, e.g. polonez ("polonaise")
some loanwords related to information technology, e.g. blog, komputer ("computer")
nouns related to human or human-like referents, e.g. nieboszczyk, trup (both of which mean "corpse"), robot ("robot"), wisielec ("the body of a hanged person"), duch ("ghost")

Contrary to fungi and bacteria, most plant names of masculine gender are inanimate, e.g. żonkil ("daffodil"), hiacynt ("hyacinth"), dąb ("oak"), cis ("yew tree"), which are all inanimate. The noun goździk ("carnation") is an exception as a masculine animate. Not all technological loanwords are animate either, e.g. inanimate modem, telefon ("telephone, cellphone"), and tranzystor ("transistor"). Robot can be treated as animate or inanimate.

It is common for personal masculine nouns to change gender to inanimate to create semantic neologisms, for example edytor ("editor", pl. ci edytorzy) and edytor (tekstu) ("word processor software", pl. te edytory).

For non-living objects that represent humans (e.g. in games), personal masculine nouns usually change gender to animate; for example, the word król ("king"), which is masculine-personal when referring to a monarch (pl. ci królowie), becomes masculine-animate when referring to the playing card or the chess piece (pl. te króle).

There are also a few pairs of homographs that completely change their meaning depending on their gender. Examples are:

Homographs that differ only by their gender can also occur in some Polish place names; for example, the town of Ostrów (Wielkopolski) is masculine, while the town of Ostrów (Mazowiecka) is feminine.

Declension 
Typical declension patterns are as follows:

  ("club"; an inanimate masculine noun) – N/A , G , D , I , L/V . Plural: N/A/V , G , D , I , L .
  ("map"; a feminine noun) – N , G , D/L , A , I , V . Plural: N/A/V , G , D , I , L .
  ("meat'; a neuter noun) – N/A/V , G , D , I , L . Plural: N/A/V , G , D , I , L .

A common deviation from the above patterns is that many masculine nouns have genitive singular in -a rather than -u. This includes all personal and animate masculines (ending in a consonant). Also masculine animate nouns have accusative singular equal to the genitive singular (in -a). Masculine personal nouns also have accusative plural equal to genitive plural, and often have nominative plural in -i.

Adjectives

Adjectives agree with the noun they modify in terms of gender, number and case. They are declined according to the following pattern (dumny means "proud"):
masculine singular: N/V , G , D , A  (for inanimate nouns)/dumnego (animate), I/L 
feminine singular: N/V , G/D/L , A/I 
neuter singular: N/V/A , G/D/I/L as masculine
plural: N/V/A  (but for masculine personal nouns N/V  A ), G/L , D , I 

For a table showing the declension of Polish adjectival surnames, ending in -ski/-ska or -cki/-cka, see Declension of adjectival surnames.

Most short adjectives have a comparative form in -szy or -iejszy, and a superlative obtained by prefixing naj- to the comparative.

Adverbs are formed from adjectives with the ending ie, or in some cases -o. Comparatives of adverbs are formed (where they exist) with the ending -iej. Superlatives have the prefix naj- as for adjectives.

Pronouns
The personal pronouns of Polish (nominative forms) are ja ("I"), ty ("you", singular, familiar),  ("he", or "it" corresponding to masculine nouns),  ("she", or "it" corresponding to feminine nouns),  ("it" corresponding to neuter nouns),  ("we"),  ("you", plural, familiar),  ("they", corresponding to a masculine personal group – see Noun syntax below),  ("they" in other cases; group where there are only girls/women).

The polite second-person pronouns are the same as the nouns  ("gentleman, Mr"),  ("lady, Mrs") and their plurals . All second-person pronouns are often capitalized for politeness, in letters etc.

1 Long form used in stressed situations.

2 Short clitic form used in unstressed situations.

3 Form used after prepositions.

For the full declension of these pronouns, see Pronouns in the article on Polish morphology. Subject pronouns can be dropped if the meaning is clear and they are not emphasized. Sometimes there are alternative forms available for a given personal pronoun in a given case:

There is also a reflexive possessive .

The prefix tam- can be added to emphasize a more distant referent ("that" as opposed to "this").

The word  also means "which" as an interrogative pronoun and adjective.

The pronoun and adjective  means "all". It is used most commonly in the plural (wszyscy means "everyone"), and in the neuter singular  to mean "everything". The pronoun and adjective  means "each, every", while  means "no, none".

For full information on the declension of the above pronouns, see Pronouns in the article on Polish morphology.

When the referent of a pronoun is a person of unspecified sex, the masculine form of the pronoun is generally used. When the referent is a thing or idea that does not correspond to any specific noun, it is treated as neuter.

Numbers and quantifiers
Polish has a complex system of numerals and related quantifiers, with special rules for their inflection, for the case of the governed noun, and for verb agreement with the resulting noun phrase.

The basic numerals are 0 , 1 , 2 , 3 , 4 , 5 , 6 , 7 , 8 , 9 , 10 , 11 , 12 , 13 , 14 , 15 , 16 , 17 , 18 , 19 , 20 , 30 , 40 , 50 , 60 , 70 , 80 , 90 , 100 , 200 , 300 , 400 , 500 , 600 , 700 , 800 , 900 .

These numerals are inflected for case, and also to some extent for gender. For details of their inflection, see Numbers and quantifiers in the article on Polish morphology.

Compound numbers are constructed similarly as in English (for example, 91,234 is ).

When a numeral modifies a noun, the numeral takes the expected case, but the noun may not; also the gender and number of the resulting noun phrase may not correspond to that of the noun. The following rules apply:
The numeral  (1) behaves as an ordinary adjective, and no special rules apply. It can even be used in the plural, for example to mean "some" (and not others), or to mean "one" with pluralia tantum, e.g.  "one door" (drzwi has no singular).
, "4 cats stood").
With other numbers (5, 6, etc., 20, 21, 25, etc.), if the numeral is nominative or accusative, the noun takes the genitive plural form, and the resulting noun phrase is neuter singular (e.g. , "5 cats stood").
If the numeral is in the genitive, dative, instrumental or locative, the noun takes the same case as the numeral (except sometimes in the case of numbers that end with the nouns for 1000 and higher quantities, which often take a genitive noun regardless since they are treated as normal nouns).

Polish also has a series of numerals called collective numerals , namely  (for 2),  (for 3),  (for 4),  (for 5), and so on. These are used with the following types of nouns:
Personal and animate neuter nouns (e.g.  ("child"),  ("kitten"))
Plural nouns referring to a group containing both sexes (for example,  refers to a group of four students of mixed sex) 
For the declension of collective numerals by case, see the morphology article section. They all follow the rule that when the numeral is nominative or accusative, the noun becomes genitive plural, and the resulting noun phrase is neuter singular. In this case the genitive noun is also used after the instrumental of the numeral.

Certain quantifiers behave similarly to numerals. There are also indefinite numerals  (and similar forms with parę-), meaning "several-teen", several tens and several hundred.

Quantifiers that always take the genitive of nouns include  ("much, many"),  ("few, little"),  ("more"),  ("less") (also  "most/least"),  ("a bit"),  ("plenty, a lot").

However the collective forms  (in the nominative/vocative), when referring to a married couple or similar, take the nominative form of the noun rather than the genitive, and form a masculine plural noun phrase (oboje rodzice byli, "both parents were", cf. ).

For the declension of all the above quantifiers, see the morphology article section.

Verbs 

Polish verbs have the grammatical category of aspect. Each verb is either imperfective, meaning that it denotes continuous or habitual events, or perfective, meaning that it denotes single completed events (in particular, perfective verbs have no present tense). Verbs often occur in imperfective and perfective pairs – for example,  and  both mean "to eat", but the first has imperfective aspect, the second perfective.

Imperfective verbs have three tenses: present, past and future, the last being a compound tense (except in the case of  "to be"). Perfective verbs have a past tense and a simple future tense, the latter formed on the same pattern as the present tense of imperfective verbs. Both types also have imperative and conditional forms. The dictionary form of a verb is the infinitive, which usually ends with -ć (occasionally with -c). The present-day past tense derives from the old Slavic "perfect" tense; several other old tenses (the aorist, imperfect) have been dropped.

The present tense of imperfective verbs (and future tense of perfective verbs) has six forms, for the three persons and two numbers. (meaning "(I) shall eat" etc.)

The verb  has the irregular present tense . It also has a simple future tense (see below).

The past tense agrees with the subject in gender as well as person and number. The basic past stem is in -ł; to this are added endings for gender and number, and then personal endings are further added for the first and second person forms.

The conditional is formed from the past tense, and the personal ending (if any).

"what did you do"). The same applies to the conditional endings (kiedy byście przyszli as an alternative to  "when would you come").

and is not to be confused with the conditional clitic . Such clauses may express "in order that", or be used with verbs meaning "want", "expect", etc.

The future tense of other imperfective verbs is formed using the future of  together with the infinitive, or the past form (inflected for gender and number, but without any personal suffixes), of the verb in question. The choice between infinitive and past form is usually a free one, but with modals governing another infinitive, the past form is used:  (not ) "he will have to leave".

The second personal singular imperative is formed from the present tense by dropping the ending (e.g. : 2/3S present , imperative ), sometimes adding -ij or -aj. Add -my and -cie for the 1P and 2P forms. To make third-person imperative sentences (including with the polite second-person pronouns  etc.) the particle  is used at the start of the sentence (or at least before the verb), with the verb in the future tense (if  or perfective) or present tense (otherwise). There is a tendency to prefer imperfective verbs in imperative sentences for politeness; negative imperatives quite rarely use perfectives.

Other forms of the verb are:
present adjectival participle (imperfective verbs only), formed from the present adverbial participle by adding adjectival endings, as  etc., meaning "singing" (as an attributive adjective), although such participles can be used to form extended adjectival phrases, which (usually unlike in English) can precede the noun. 
passive participle (all transitive verbs), in -ny or -ty (conjugated as an adjective). This often corresponds to the English past participle, both in fully adjectival use and in passive voice.
subjectless past tense, formed as the past participle but with the ending -o (e.g.  "there was sung").
past active participle (perfective verbs only), like  "having killed" (from  "kill"); this form is invariant.
verbal noun, also called gerund, formed from the past participle with the ending -ie, e.g. . This is a neuter noun.

Prepositions
Polish uses prepositions, which form phrases by preceding a noun or noun phrase. Different prepositions take different cases (all cases are possible except nominative and vocative); some prepositions can take different cases depending on meaning.

The prepositions z and w are pronounced together with the following word, obeying the usual rules for consonant cluster voicing (so  "with you" is pronounced ). "in Wrocław"). These forms are also used before the first-person singular pronouns in mn-; several other prepositions also have longer forms before these pronouns (przeze mnie, pode mną etc.), and these phrases are pronounced as single words, with the stress on the penultimate syllable (the -e).

Common prepositions include:
na, with the locative with basic meaning "on", and with the accusative with basic meaning "onto" (also metaphorical meanings)
w, with the locative with basic meaning "in", and with the accusative with basic meaning "into" (also metaphorical meanings)
z, with the instrumental comitative meaning "with" (in accompaniment of); with the genitive meaning "from, out of"
do/od, with genitive, meaning "to, into/from"
dla, with genitive, meaning "for"
o, with locative meaning "about", also with the accusative in some constructions
przed/za/nad/pod with instrumental meaning "before, in front of/behind/over/under", also with the accusative in some meanings (and genitive in the case of ); there are also compound prepositions  ("from in front of" etc.) taking the genitive
przez with the accusative, meaning "through" etc.
przeciw(ko) with dative, meaning "against" (but  "opposite" takes genitive)
po, with locative meaning "after", also with the accusative in some meanings
przy, with locative, meaning "next to" etc.
bez, with genitive, meaning "without"

Conjunctions

In written Polish, subordinate clauses are normally set off with commas. Commas are not normally used before conjunctions meaning "and" or "or".

Syntax

Word order
Basic word order in Polish is SVO; however, as it is a synthetic language, it is possible to move words around in the sentence.

Certain words, however, behave as clitics: they rarely or never begin a clause, but are used after another stressed word, and tend to appear early in the clause. Examples of these are the weak pronouns ,  etc., the reflexive pronoun , and the personal past tense endings and conditional endings described under Verbs above.
  
Polish is a pro-drop language; subject pronouns are frequently dropped. For example:  (literally "has a cat") may mean "he/she/it has a cat". It is also possible to drop the object or even sometimes verb, if they are obvious from context.

Note the interrogative particle , which is used to start a yes/no question, much like the French "est-ce que". The particle is not obligatory, and sometimes rising intonation is the only signal of the interrogative character of the sentence.

Negation is achieved by placing  directly before the verb, or other word or phrase being negated (in some cases nie- is prefixed to the negated word, equivalent to English un- or non-).
 
The equivalent of the English "there is" etc. is the appropriate part of the verb  ("to be"), e.g. ("there is..."),  ("there are..."),  ("there was..."), etc., with a noun phrase in the nominative. (as usual, the word order is not fixed).

Subjectless sentences
There are various types of sentence in Polish that do not have subjects:
Sentences where the subject pronoun is dropped (see above), but is still understood.
Sentences with the subjectless past tense form of the verb (see Verbs above).

Noun syntax
The use of the cases of nouns is as follows:
 The nominative (the dictionary form of a noun) is used for sentence subject and for certain complements (as in sentences of the form X to Y "X is Y", to jest Y "this is Y").
 The accusative is used for the direct object of verbs that are not negated, as the object of some prepositions, and in some time expressions.
 The genitive is used for possessor and similar (equivalent to English "of X" or "X's"), for the direct object of negated verbs, as the object of some verbs and prepositions, as an object with partitive meaning and in some fixed expressions, and for nouns governed by certain numbers and expressions of quantity (see Numbers and quantifiers above).
 The locative is used only as the object of certain prepositions (particularly  "in" and  "on", when they have static meaning).
"it is allowed to him"), and as the object of some verbs and prepositions.
 The instrumental is used for the means (instrument) by which something is done, for example  (instrumental of  "train") means "by train".
 The vocative is used to indicate who or what is being addressed. However, with personal names, in colloquial speech, the nominative is usually used instead.

Like most Slavic languages, with the exception of Bulgarian and Macedonian, Polish uses no definite or indefinite articles. A noun such as  may mean either "the cat" or "a cat".

Polish does not regularly place nouns together to form compound noun expressions.

A group of nouns connected by a word for "and" is treated as plural. It is masculine personal plural if it contains any male person (in fact, if it contains any person and any masculine noun).

Adjective syntax
Adjectives generally precede the noun they modify, although in some fixed expressions and official names and phrases they can follow the noun (as in  "Polish language"; also  "good day, hello").

Attributive adjectives agree in gender, number and case with the noun they modify. Predicate adjectives agree with the relevant noun in gender and number, and are in the nominative case, unless the subject is unspecified (as in some infinitive phrases), in which case the adjective takes the (masculine/neuter) instrumental form (for example, "to be wise", although the nominative is used if the logical subject is specified).

Adjectives are sometimes used as nouns; for example,  ("green") may mean "the/a green one" etc.

References

 
 
 Polish Pronunciation Audio and Grammar Charts

 

 
Grammar